The Director's Chair is an American talk show created and hosted by filmmaker Robert Rodriguez. It premiered on May 10, 2014 on El Rey and features Rodriguez interviewing other filmmakers about their filmmaking techniques and their careers.

Episodes

See also
 Academy Award for Best Director
 Academy Award for Best Picture

References

External links
 
 

2014 American television series debuts
Univision original programming
American television talk shows
Works by Robert Rodriguez